Zangebar Rural District is in the Central District of Poldasht County, West Azerbaijan province, Iran. At the National Census of 2006, its population (as a part of the former Poldasht District of Maku County) was 11,154 in 2,496 households. There were 11,096 inhabitants in 2,814 households at the following census of 2011, by which time the district had been separated from the county, Poldasht County established, and divided into two districts: the Central and Aras Districts. At the most recent census of 2016, the population of the rural district was 10,574 in 2,864 households. The largest of its 43 villages was Bohlulabad, with 1,326 people.

References 

Poldasht County

Rural Districts of West Azerbaijan Province

Populated places in West Azerbaijan Province

Populated places in Poldasht County